This aims to be a complete list of the articles on real estate.



# 
 72-hour clause

A 
 Abandonment
 Abstract of title
 Acceleration clause
 Accession
 Acknowledgment
 Acre – a measure of land area
 Action to quiet title
 Ad valorem tax
 ADA
 Adjustable-rate mortgage (ARM)
 Adjusted basis
 Administrator/Administratrix
 Adverse possession
 Agency – Real estate agency, Buyer brokerage
 Agent – Real estate agent or broker, Estate agent
 Agreement
 Air rights
 Alienation
 Allodial, Allodium
 Allodial title
 Alluvion
 Amenity
 American Land Title Association (ALTA)
 Americans with Disabilities Act of 1990
 Amortization calculator
 Amortization schedule
 Amortizing loan
 Anchor store
 Annexation
 Annual percentage rate
 Apartment
 Appraisal, real estate
 Appraised value – An estimate of the present worth of a property
 Appreciation
 APR
 Appurtenance
 Appurtenant easement
 ARELLO
 Arm's length transaction
 Arrears
 Article 4 of the United States Constitution
 Artificial person
 Asking price
 Assemblage
 Assignee
 Assignment
 Assignment of contract
 Assignor
 Assessed value – The value set upon a property for taxation purposes
 Assessment
 Association of Real Estate License Law Officials (ARELLO)
 Assumable loan
 Assumable mortgage
 Attorney-at-law
 Attorney-in-fact
 Auction
 Avulsion
 Assessor
 Assumption of mortgage

B 
 Balance
 Balloon mortgage
 Bargain-and-sale deed
 Baseline – a line that is a base for measurement or construction, lines that divide north/south or east/west in surveying
 Basis
 Benchmark
 Beneficiary
 Bequest
 Bhoodan movement
 Bilateral contract – contract in which only one party makes a promise
 Bill of sale
 Binder – In law, a binder (also known as an agreement for sale, earnest money contract, memorandum of sale, contract to sell) is a short-form preliminary contract in which the purchaser agrees to buy and the seller agrees to sell certain real estate under stated terms and conditions, usually in the form of a purchase offer, and is enforceable in a court of law and used to secure a real estate transaction until a more formal, fully negotiated contract of sale can be signed. See offer and acceptance.
 Blanket loan, Blanket mortgage
 Block
 Blockbusting
 Boiler insurance
 Bona fide purchaser
 Book value
 Boot
 Boundary
 Breach of contract
 Broker
 Brokerage – Mortgage broker, Real estate broker, Buyer brokerage
 Broker's Price Opinion (BPO)
 BPO Standards and Guidelines
 Budget
 Building code
 Bundle of rights
 Buyer brokerage
 Buyer's agent

C 
 Canadian Real Estate Association (CREA)
 Capital appreciation
 Capital gain
 Cap rate, Capitalization rate 
 Cash flow
 Caveat emptor
 Certificate of occupancy
 Certified Relocation and Transition Specialist
 Chain – sequence of linked house purchases
 Chain – unit of measurement
 Chain of title
 Chattel
 Chattel mortgage
 City block
 Civil action
 Civil Rights Act of 1866
 Civil Rights Act of 1968
 Clause
 Client
 Closing costs
 Closing
 Closing statement
 Cloud on a title, Cloud on title
 Coinsurance, Coinsurance clause
 Collateral
 Color of title
 Commercial property
 Commingling
 Commission
 Comprehensive planning for community development
 Confiscation
 Commitment
 Common area
 Common law
 Community-based planning
 Community land trust
 Community planning
 Community property
 Comparables
 Compensatory damages, Expectation damages
 Competition
 Condemnation – building is deemed no longer habitable, government seizure through Eminent domain, or Urban decay
 Condominium
 Condominium conversion, Condo conversion
 Confidentiality, Confidential information
 Conformity
 Conservation land trust
 Consideration
 Construction loan, Construction mortgage
 Constructive eviction
 Consumer
 Contingency, Contingencies
 Continuing education requirement
 Contour map
 Contract for deed
 Contract of sale
 Contract
 Contribution
 Conventional mortgage
 Conversion – removal of personal property or building fixtures
 Conversion – process of changing a building to condominium
 Courtesy signing
 Covenants
 Convey, Conveyance, Conveyancing
 Cooling-off period
 Cooperating broker
 Cooperative apartment
 Co-op
 Co-ownership
 Copyhold
 Corporation
 Corporeal property
 Corrective maintenance
 Cost basis
 Council housing
 Counteroffer
 Courtesy tenure
 Covenant
 Covenant Against Encumbrances
 Covenant for Further Assurances
 Covenant of Quiet Enjoyment
 Covenant of Right to Convey
 Covenant of Seisin
 Covenant of Warranty
 CREA
 Credit
 Creditor
 Cul-de-sac
 Customer

D 
 Damages for breach of contract
 Datum
 Debit
 Debt service coverage ratio
 Decedent
 Declaration of Condominium
 Declaration of Restriction
 Decree
 Deductible expense
 Deed
 Deed in bargain and sale
 Deed in lieu of foreclosure
 Deed in trust
 Deed of gift
 Deed of trust
 Deed restriction
 Default
 Defeasance clause
 Defeasible fee
 Defeasible estate
 Deficiency – physical condition or construction that is considered sub-standard or below minimum expectations
 Deficiency judgment
 Delivery and acceptance
 Demise
 Department of Housing and Urban Development (HUD)
 Depreciable asset
 Depreciated value
 Depreciation
 Descent
 Designated agency, Designated agent
 Devise – disposal of real property in a will and testament, or the property itself which has been disposed of
 Devisee – beneficiary of a will and testament
 Disability
 Discount points
 Disintermediation
 Documentary stamp
 Documentary stamp tax
 Domania
 Dominant estate, Dominant tenement
 Dominant portion
 Dominion Land Survey
 Double closing
 Dower
 Dual agent, Dual agency
 Due-on-sale clause
 Duress

E 
 Earnest money
 Earthquake insurance
 Easement
 Easement appurtenant
 Easement by condemnation
 Easement by implication
 Easement by necessity
 Easement by prescription
 Easement in gross
 ECOA
 Economic depression
 Economic rent
 Effective demand
 Effective interest rate
 Egress
 Egress window
 Ejectment
 Ejido
 Emblements
 Eminent domain
 Enabling act
 Encroachment
 Encumbrance
 Endorsement – signature on a contract thereby indicating the person's intent to become a party to the contract
 Enforceable
 Environmental Protection Agency
 Equal Credit Opportunity Act (ECOA)
 Equitable title
 Equity
 Equity of redemption
 Escheat
 Escrow
 Escrow account
 Escrow agent
 Escrow instructions
 Escrow payment
 Estate – legal term for a person's net worth at any point in time alive or dead
 Estate – a very large property (such as country house or mansion) with houses, outbuildings, gardens, supporting farmland, and woods
 Estate agent
 Estate for years
 Estate manager
 Estate tax
 Estoppel
 Et al.
 Et ux., Et uxor
 Et vir
 Evaluation
 Eviction
 Exclusive agency
 Exclusive right to sell
 Executed contract
 Execution
 Executor
 Executory contract
 Executrix
 Exempt – Grandfather clause that allows a pre-existing condition to continue, Tax exemption that legally excludes income or other value to reduce taxable income
 Exercise of option
 Expectation damages
 Express contract
 Extended coverage

F 
 Fair Housing Act of 1968
 Fair Housing Amendments Act of 1988
 Fair market value
 Fannie Mae
 Fed, the
 Freddie Mac
 Federal Home Loan Mortgage Corporation (FHLMC or Freddie Mac)
 Federal Housing Administration (FHA)
 Federal National Mortgage Association (FNMA or Fannie Mae)
 Federal Real Estate Board
 Federal Reserve System
 Fee simple
 Fee simple absolute
 Fee simple determinable
 Fee simple subject to condition subsequent
 Feudal system as applicable to real estate
 FHA
 FHA-insured loan
 Field Card
 Financial Institutions Reform, Recovery, and Enforcement Act of 1989 (FIRREA)
 Fire insurance
 FIRREA
 First mortgage – as opposed to Second mortgage
 Fixed-rate mortgage
 Fixer-upper
 Fixture
 Flat-fee MLS
 Flipping
 Flood hazard area
 Flood insurance
 Foreclosure
 Four unities
 Fraud
 Freehold
 Freehold estate
 For Sale By Owner
 FSBO
 Functional obsolescence
 Future interest

G 
 General plan
 General warranty deed
 Gentrification
 Ginnie Mae
 GNMA
 Good faith estimate
 Government National Mortgage Association (GNMA or Ginnie Mae)
 Graduated payment mortgage
 Gramdan
 Grant bargain and sale deed
 Grant
 Grant deed
 Grantee
 Grantor
 Green belt
 Ground lease
 Ground rent

H 
 Habendum clause
 Habitable
 Hard money
 Hard money lenders
 Hard money loan
 Hazard insurance
 Heirs, Heirs and assigns
 Hereditament
 Heterogeneous
 Highest and best use
 (HOA)
 Holographic will
 Home construction loan
 Home equity line of credit (HELOC)
 Home rule
 Home-equity debt
 Home equity loan
 Home inspection – especially Home buyers inspection before closing or Pre-delivery inspection of new construction
 Homeowners association (HOA)
 Homeowner's insurance
 Homeowner's policy
 Home warranty
 Homestead
 Homestead exemption
 Homogeneous
 Housing association
 Housing bubble
 Housing tenure
 Housing and Urban Development (HUD)
 Housing cooperative
 HUD
 HUD-1 Settlement Statement
 Hypothecation

I 
 IBC
 Illusory offer, Illusory promise
 ILSA
 ILSFDA
 Immobility – immovable real estate
 Immovable property
 Implied contract
 Implied warranty
 Improved land
 Improvements – Home improvement or Land improvement
 Inspection
 Income approach for appraisal
 Income property – real estate rented out to provide income for the landlord
 Income shelter
 Incompetent
 Incorporeal property
 Indemnification
 Ingress
 Inheritance tax
 Injunction
 Installment land contract
 Installment sale
 Interest rate
 International Building Code (IBC)
 Internet Data Exchange (IDX)
 Instrument
 Insurable interest
 Interest
 Interstate Land Sales Full Disclosure Act of 1968 (ILSFDA or ILSA)
 Intestate
 Intestate succession
 Invalid
 Investing in real estate – Real estate investing, Real estate investment club, Flipping property
 Investment
 Investment rating for real estate
 Investment value
 Involuntary alienation
 Firm offer

J 
 Jeonse
 Joint and several liability
 Joint tenancy
 Joint venture
 Judgment
 Judgment lien
 Judicial foreclosure
 Junior mortgage – smaller mortgage in addition to the primary mortgage; examples: second mortgage, 80-15-5 piggy-back loan, and home equity loan
Jurisdiction

K 
 Key money

L 
 Laches
 Land
 Land bank, Land banking
 Land contract
 Land grant
 Land lease
 Land registration
 Land tenure
 Land Trust Alliance
 Land trust
 Landlocked
 Landlord
 Law of agency
 Lawful
 Lease
 Lease option
 Leaseback
 Leasehold
 Leasehold estate
 Legal capacity
 Legal description
 Legal entity
 Legal personality
 Legal interest rate – the opposite of Usury
 Lenders mortgage insurance
 Lessee
 Lessor
 Leverage
 Levy – a fine as penalty, seizure of debtor's property after judgment, financial charge such as tax
 Licensee
 Lien
 Lienee – property owner who grants the lien
 Lienor – person who benefit from the lien 
 Lien holder – person who benefit from the lien 
 Life estate
 Life tenant – owner of a life estate
 Like-kind property exchange
 Limited liability company (LLC)
 Limited partnership
 Liquidated damages
 Liquidation value
 Liquidity
 Lis pendens
 Listing contract
 Litigation
 Littoral rights
 LLC
 LMI
 Loan origination fee
 Loan-to-value ratio (LTV)
 Location
 Lot
 Lot and Block survey system
 LTV

M 
 Market
 Market analysis
 Market value
 Marketable title
 Master plan for community development
 Masters of Real Estate Development
 Material fact
 Materialman's lien
 Mechanic's lien
 Meeting of minds
 Menace
 Merger
 Metes and bounds
 Mill
 Millage tax
 Mineral lease
 Mineral rights
 Mini dorm
 Ministerial act
 Minor
 MIP
 Misrepresentation
 MLS
 Mortgage
 Mortgage Account Error Correction, see Real Estate Settlement Procedures Act
 Mortgage assumption
 Mortgage bank, Mortgage banker
 MGIC
 Mortgage insurance premium (MIP)
 Mortgage loan
 Mortgage broker
 Mortgage Guaranty Insurance Corporation (MGIC)
 Mortgage insurance
 Mortgagee – borrower
 Mortgagor – lender
 Multiple Listing Service (MLS)
 Mutual agreement
 Mutual assent
 Mutual mistake
 Mutual savings bank

N 

 NAEA
 NAR
 NAREB
 National Association of Estate Agents (NAEA)
 National Association of Real Estate Brokers (NAREB)
 National Association of Realtors (NAR)
 National Environmental Policy Act (NEPA)
 National Flood Insurance Program
 Negative amortization
 Negligence
 NEPA
 Net income
 Net lease
 Net operating income
 Notary Public
 Note
 Niche real estate
 Nonconforming use
 Notice of lis pendens
 Novation
 Null and void

O 
 Obligee
 Obligor
 Obsolescence
 Occupancy
 Offer
 Offer and acceptance
 Offeree
 Offeror
 Open listing or Open agency
 Operation of law
 Option
 Ordinance
 OREO
 Origination fee
 Other Real Estate Owned (OREO)
 Outdated
 Overimprovement – building and land improvements that far surpass other local properties
 Owner-occupancy
 Ownership

P 
 Parol evidence rule
 Participation mortgage
 Partition
 Partnership
 Party wall
 Peak land value intersection
 Perc test, Percolation test
 Percolation
 Personal property
 PITI
 Planned community
 Plat
 Pledge
 Plottage
 PLSS
 PMI
 Pocket listing
 Points
 Police power
 Population density
 Positive misrepresentation
 Power of attorney
 Pre-delivery inspection
 Prepaid expenses
 Prepayment penalty
 Prescription
 Prescriptive easement
 Preventive maintenance
 Price fixing
 Pricing
 Prima facie
 Prima facie case
 Primary residence
 Prime rate
 Principal – the amount of money owed on a mortgage loan
 Principal meridian
 Principal residence
 Private equity real estate
 Private mortgage insurance (PMI)
 Private property
 Privity of contract
 Probate
 Profit à prendre
 Promissory note
 Promulgate, Promulgation
 Property management
 Property manager
 Proration
 Provision
 Public housing
 Public property
 Public Land Survey System (PLSS)
 Public record
 Public utility
 Punitive damages
 Pur autre vie

Q 
 Quarter section
 Quiet enjoyment
 Quiet title
 Quiet title action
 Quiet title proceeding
 Quitclaim deed

R 
 Racial steering
 Rate of return
 Ratification
 Ratify
 Rating for real estate investment
 Real estate
 Real estate agency
 Real estate agent
 Real estate appraisal (property valuation, land valuation)
 Real estate benchmarking
 Real estate broker
 Real estate brokerage
 Real estate bubble
 Real estate contract
 Real estate development
 Real estate economics
 Real estate investment trust (REIT)
 Real Estate Owned (REO)
 Real estate salesperson
 Real Estate Settlement Procedures Act (RESPA)
 Real estate trading
 Real estate trends
 Real property
 Realtor
 Recording
 Recourse note
 Recovery and Enforcement Act (Financial Institutions Reform, Recovery, and Enforcement Act of 1989, FIRREA)
 Redemption
 Redlining
 Refinancing
 Regress
 Regulation Z
 REIT
 Reject
 Remainder
 Remainderman
 Remise
 Rent
 Rent-back agreement, Rent-back clause
 REO
 Replacement cost, Replacement value
 Repossession
 Rescission
 Resident manager – Estate manager, Property manager, Building superintendent
 Residual income
 Restrictive covenant
 Revaluation of fixed assets 
 Reverse mortgage, Reverse annuity mortgage
 Reversion
 Reversionary interest
 Revocation
 RICS
 Right of first refusal
 Right of redemption
 Right of survivorship
 Right to emblements
 Riparian rights, Riparian water rights
 Risk management
 Royal Institution of Chartered Surveyors (RICS)
Run with the land

S 
 S corporation
 Sale and leaseback
 Sales contract
 Salesperson – Estate agent, Real estate agent
 Salvage value
 SAM
 Savings and loan association
 Scarcity
 Scavenger sale
 Second mortgage
 Secondary mortgage
 Secondary mortgage market
 Section – unit of land: 640 acres in the U.S., 1 square mile plots in Western Canada, the Alberta Township System
 Securitization
 Security deposit
 Seisin
 Seizing
 Self-build mortgage
 Seller agency
 Separate property
 Servient estate, Servient tenement
 Setback
 Settlement costs
 Settlement statement
 Settlement
 Shared appreciation mortgage (SAM)
 Sheriff's deed
 Situs
 Sole proprietorship
 Special agent – person acting under a Power of attorney
 Special assessment, Special assessment tax
 Special warranty deed
 Special flood hazard area
 Specific performance
 Speculation
 Spot zoning
 Squatter's rights
 Starker exchange, Starker Trust
 Starter home
 Statute of Frauds
 Statute of limitations
 Statutory foreclosure
 Steering
 Stigmatized property
 Straight–line depreciation
 Strata title
 Strict foreclosure
 Style obsolescence
 Sub-agent
 Subdivision
 Subdivision lot block and tract
 Subject-to
 Sublease
 Sublet
 Subordination
 Subordination agreement
 Supply and demand
 Survivorship
 Sweat equity

T 
 Tacking
 Tax assessment
 Tax basis
 Tax credit
 Tax sale
 Tax shelter
 Tax-deductible expense
 Tax-deferred exchange
 Tenancy by the entirety
 Tenancy in common
 Tenant
 Tenements
 Testate – opposite of Intestate
 Testator
 Testatrix
 Theory of value
 TILA
 Timeshare
 Title
 Title insurance
 Torrens title
 Truth in Lending Act of 1968 (TILA)
 Township
 Tract
 Trespasser
 Trust deed
 Trust deed investment company
 Trust
 Trustee
 Trustor

U 
 UCC
 Underimprovement – building and land improvements that are far below the level of other local properties
 Underwriting
 Undisclosed principal
 Undivided interest
 Undue influence
 Unencumbered property – a property without any encumbrance
 Unenforceable contract
 Uniform Commercial Code (UCC)
 Uniform Standards of Professional Appraisal Practice (USPAP)
 Uniform Vendor and Purchaser Risk Act (UVPRA)
 Unilateral contract – contract in which all parties make promises
 Unintentional misrepresentation – also called innocent misrepresentation
 Unities
 Unlike-kind property exchange – opposite of Like-kind exchange
 USPAP
 United States housing bubble
 Urban renewal
 Urban sprawl
 Urban Land Institute
 Usufruct
 Usury
 Utility

V 
 VA loan
 Valuable consideration
 Valuation
 Value in exchange
 Value in use
 Value theory
 Value
 Variance
 Vendee – buyer of goods or services
 Vendor – supplier/seller of goods or services
 Vicarious liability
 Void contract
 Voidable contract
 Voluntary alienation

W 
 Warranty deed
 Warranty of title
 Waste
 With reserve – in an auction, the price ("reservation price" or "reserve") below which the seller will not sell the item/property
 Words of conveyance
 Wraparound mortgage
 Writ of attachment

Y 
 Yield
 Yield spread premium

Z 
 Zoning
 Zoning map
 Zoning ordinance – local ordinance that controls land use and buildings

Real estate

Real estate topics
Real estate topics
Law-related lists
Real estate lists